Puliyakudi is a village in the Pattukkottai taluk of Thanjavur district, Tamil Nadu, India.

Demographics 

As per the 2011 census, Puliyakudi had a total population of 3,434 with 1,692 males and 1,742 females. The sex ratio was 1030. The literacy rate was 67.29 %.

References 

 

Villages in Thanjavur district